Star Trek is a science fiction franchise.

Star Trek may also refer to:

Star Trek franchise

Television
 Star Trek: The Original Series, a 1966–69 live-action series known simply as Star Trek
 Star Trek: The Animated Series or The Animated Adventures of Gene Roddenberry's Star Trek, a 1973–74 animated series
 See also: List of Star Trek television series

Books and comics
 Star Trek (Bantam Books), several series of novelizations, original novels, and other books, published 1967—1991
 Star Trek (DC Comics), a 1984–1996 comic book series
 Star Trek (IDW Publishing), a comic book series since 2007
 See also: Star Trek (comics)

Film
 Star Trek: The Motion Picture, a 1979 film 
 Star Trek (film), a 2009 film
 Star Trek (novel), a novelization of the 2009 film
 Star Trek (soundtrack), a soundtrack album from the 2009 film
 See also: List of Star Trek films

Games
 Star Trek (script game), a text-based mainframe computer game from the early 1970s
 Star Trek (1971 video game), a text-based computer game from the late 1970s
 Star Trek (1979 pinball), a pinball game developed by Bally
 Star Trek: The Role Playing Game, a 1982 role-playing game by FASA Corporation
 Star Trek Roleplaying Game, a 2002 role-playing game by Decipher
 Star Trek, a variation of Computer Space, a video game
 Star Trek (arcade game), from 1983, developed by Sega Electronics
 Star Trek (2013 video game), developed by Digital Extremes
 See also: History of Star Trek games

Outside the franchise
 "Star Trek" (American Dad!), an episode of American Dad!
 Star Trek project, a canceled port of Apple's System 7.1 operating system to Intel x86 computers in collaboration with Novell

See also
 HTC Startrek, a Windows Mobile smartphone
 Star Track (disambiguation)
 Star Trak Entertainment, a record label also known as Star Trak